The Hong Kong women's national ice hockey team is the women's national ice hockey team of Hong Kong. The team began participating in the IIHF World Championship in 2014 at the Division II Qualification level in Mexico City.

Tournament record

World Championships
2014 – Finished in 36th place (4th in Division IIB Qualification)
2015 – Finished in 34th place (2nd in Division IIB Qualification)
2016 – Finished in 34th place (2nd in Division IIB Qualification)
2017 – Finished in 37th place (5th in Division IIB Qualification)
2018 – Finished in 37th place (4th in Division IIB Qualification)
2019 – Finished in 38th place (4th in Division IIB Qualification)
2020 – Finished in 40th place (6th in Division III)
2021 – Cancelled due to the COVID-19 pandemic
2022 – Withdrawn due to the COVID-19 pandemic

Asian Games
2017 – Finished in 6th place

All-time record against other nations
Last match update: 18 March 2022

References

External links
Official website
IIHF profile

Ice hockey in Hong Kong
Ice hockey
Women's national ice hockey teams in Asia